Volkmar Thiede (born 21 May 1948) is a former East German sprint canoeist who competed in the early to mid-1970s. He won a bronze medal at the 1974 ICF Canoe Sprint World Championships in Mexico City in K-2 1000 m event.

Thiede also competed in the K-4 1000 m event at the 1972 Summer Olympics in Munich, but was eliminated in the semifinals.

References

Sports-reference.com profile

1948 births
Canoeists at the 1972 Summer Olympics
German male canoeists
Living people
Olympic canoeists of East Germany
ICF Canoe Sprint World Championships medalists in kayak